The Korean Government Employees' Union (KGEU), also known as Jeon(-)gongno in Korean language, is a labor union of government employee in South Korea. The KGEU was founded in 1999 as Korean Association of Government Employees' Work Councils and part of the Korean Confederation of Trade Unions.

References

External links
 

Trade unions in South Korea
Trade unions established in 1999
1999 establishments in South Korea
Organizations based in Seoul